In Name Only is a 1939 romantic film starring Cary Grant, Carole Lombard, and Kay Francis, directed by John Cromwell.  It was based on the 1935 novel Memory of Love by Bessie Breuer.  The fictional town where it is set, Bridgefield, Connecticut, is based on the town of Ridgefield, Connecticut.

Plot
Alec Walker (Cary Grant) puts up with a loveless marriage to Maida (Kay Francis), until he meets widow Julie Eden (Carole Lombard). They fall in love and he asks his wife for a divorce. She refuses; as she goes on to tell him, she married him solely for his social position and wealth and will not give them up. She is such a skillful liar that she has Alec's parents (Charles Coburn, Nella Walker) convinced that Julie is out to destroy the marriage.

Julie breaks up with Alec because she cannot see any future with him. On Christmas Eve, a distraught Alec gets drunk, falls asleep in front of an open window, and becomes deathly ill.  At the hospital, Dr. Muller (Maurice Moscovitch) tells Julie and Alec's father that the patient is likely to recover if he has the will to live. Julie lies to Alec, telling him that Maida will let him go.

When Maida shows up and tries to see Alec, Julie blocks her. With no one else in the room, Maida freely admits she gave up the man she really loved for Alec's position and his father's wealth. However, Alec's parents enter behind her and overhear her cold-blooded admission. With Maida's plotting exposed, the path to Alec and Julie's happiness is now clear.

Cast
 Carole Lombard as Julie Eden
 Cary Grant as Alec Walker
 Kay Francis as Maida Walker
 Charles Coburn as Richard Walker
 Helen Vinson as Suzanne Duross, Maida's "best" friend, who makes a play for Alec
 Katherine Alexander as Laura Morton, Julie's sister, embittered against men by her own unhappy experience
 Jonathan Hale as Dr. Ned Gateson, a friend of the Walker family
 Nella Walker as Grace Walker
 Alan Baxter as Charley
 Maurice Moscovich as Dr. Muller
 Peggy Ann Garner as Ellen Eden, Julie's daughter
 Charles Coleman as Archie Duross
 Grady Sutton as Paul Graham (uncredited)

Notes
According to Robert Osborne, the film was intended to reteam Katharine Hepburn and Cary Grant. However, the disastrous reception of Bringing Up Baby led to Hepburn being considered "box-office poison" and Lombard being cast, instead.

Reception
The film was praised by critics: Variety wrote, "In the steering of the story director John Cromwell has made every situation as believable as could be accomplished in order to sustain the dramatic undercurrent, strife and the beleaguered romance which has developed. Cary Grant and Carole Lombard emerge highly impressive."
"Soap opera par excellence," wrote Frank Nugent in The New York Times, "blessed with a peerless cast."

Despite both Grant and Lombard playing against type, the film was popular and earned a profit of $155,000.

References

External links
 
 
 
 

1939 films
1939 romantic drama films
American romantic drama films
American black-and-white films
Films scored by Roy Webb
Films based on American novels
Films directed by John Cromwell
Films set in Connecticut
RKO Pictures films
1930s English-language films
1930s American films